The current Constitution of France was adopted on 4 October 1958. It is typically called the Constitution of the Fifth Republic , and it replaced the Constitution of the Fourth Republic of 1946 with the exception of the preamble per a Constitutional Council decision in July 1971. The current Constitution regards the separation of church and state, democracy, social welfare, and indivisibility as core principles of the French state.

Charles de Gaulle was the main driving force in introducing the new constitution and inaugurating the Fifth Republic, while the text was drafted by Michel Debré. Since then, the constitution has been amended twenty-four times, through 2008.

Provisions

Preamble 
The preamble of the constitution recalls the Declaration of the Rights of Man and of the Citizen from 1789 and establishes France as a secular and democratic country, deriving its sovereignty from the people.

Since 2005 it includes the ten articles of the Charter for the Environment.

Government institutions and practices 
The French Constitution established a semi-presidential system of government, with two competing readings. On one hand, the executive branch has both a President of the Republic  and a Prime Minister, which is commonly seen in parliamentary systems with a symbolic President and a Prime Minister who directs the government. This reading is supported by Articles 5 and 21 of the Constitution, which respectively states that the President is a Guardian of the State and of the Constitution, while the Prime Minister has the power to decide on Government’s actions and policies.

On the other hand, the Parliament is very weak for a parliamentary system. Parliament has a limited legislative competence: article 34 of the Constitution lists domains exclusive to Parliamentary legislation, but the remaining domains are left to the Executive's regulations. The President also has the crucial powers to call a referendum and to dissolve the National Assembly. While Parliament may make a vote of no confidence on the government, since 1962 a majority in the National Assembly has supported the Government.

Charles de Gaulle, the first President of the Fifth Republic, was instrumental in the adoption of the new constitution, as he was called back from retirement and narrowly avoided a coup resulting from the Algerian War. De Gaulle always supported the second interpretation of the constitution, in favor of a powerful President. The first socialist President François Mitterrand, elected in 1981, also supported this interpretation.

Beginning in 1986, elections have from time to time resulted in Parliaments with a majority that did not support the President. Such periods as known in France as cohabitation, where a President appoints a Prime Minister from the new parliamentary majority. During cohabitation, besides powers reserved to the President by the Constitution, all other government powers would be exercised by the Prime Minister. In 2000, the Constitution was amended by shortening the President's term of office from seven years to five, coinciding with the term of Parliament. The amendment means the Presidential election would take place around the Parliamentary election, making it more likely to have winners who agree with one another and make cohabitation less likely.

The Constitution provides for the election of the President and the Parliament, the selection of the Government, the powers of each and the relations between them. It ensures judicial authority and creates a High Court (a never-as-yet-convened court for trying the Government), a Constitutional Council (an innovation of the Fifth Republic), and an Economic and Social Council.

Treaties and the EU 
It enables the ratification of international treaties and those associated with the European Union. It is unclear whether the wording, especially the reserves of reciprocity, is compatible with European Union law.

Amendment 
The Constitution also sets out methods for its own amendment: a referendum (article 11) or a Parliamentary process with Presidential consent. The normal procedure of constitutional amendment is that the amendment must be adopted in identical terms by both houses of Parliament and then must be adopted by a simple majority in a referendum or by a three-fifths supermajority of the French Congress, a joint session of both houses of Parliament (article 89).

Principles
Prior to 1971, though executive, administrative and judicial decisions had to comply with the general principles of law (jurisprudence derived from law and the practice of law in general), there were no such restrictions on legislation. It was assumed that unelected judges and other appointees should not be able to overrule laws voted for by the directly elected French parliament.

Constitutional block 

In 1971, a landmark decision by the Constitutional Council (71-44DC) cited the preamble of the Constitution and its references to the principles laid in the Declaration of the Rights of Man and of the Citizen as a reason for rejecting a law that, according to the council, violated one of these principles. Although considered a juridical coup d’état at the time, the decision formed basis of the Constitutional Council today.

Since then, it is assumed that the "constitutional block" includes not only the Constitution, but also the other texts referred to in its preamble:
 The Declaration of the Rights of Man and of the Citizen of 1789
 The preamble of the Constitution of 1946 (which adds a number of "social rights", as well as the equality of men and women)
 The Charter for the Environment of 2004

Since then, the possibility of sending laws before the council has been extended. In practice, the political opposition sends all controversial laws before it.

Principles of the Republic
In the Constitution are written the principles of the French Republic:
 Social welfare, which means that everybody must be able to access free public services and be helped when needed.
 Laïcité, which means that the churches are separated from the State and the freedom from religion is protected.
 Democracy, which means that the Parliament and the Government are elected by the people.
 Indivisibility, which means that the French people are united in a single sovereign country with one language, the French language, and all people are equal.

Amendments

The Constitution, in Article 89, has an amending formula. First, a constitutional bill must be approved by both houses of Parliament. Then, the bill must either be approved by the Congress, a special joint session of both houses, or submitted to a referendum.

In 1962, Charles de Gaulle proposed that the President be elected by direct suffrage. He bypassed the amendment procedure by directly sending a constitutional amendment to referendum (article 11). The Art. 11 procedure was envisioned as a procedure for proposing legislation, including changing the organization of constitutional institutions. The 1962 referendum was approved by 62% of the vote but only 46% of registered voters. The amendment permitted the establishment of a popularly-elected presidency, which would otherwise have been vetoed by the Parliament.

The referendum was highly controversial at the time, but the Constitutional Council ruled that it can only review legislative acts for unconstitutionality, not executive acts; since the referendum was proposed by the executive, it was unreviewable. Since a referendum expressed the will of the sovereign people, the Council ruled that the amendment had been adopted. Some scholars had regarded the amendment as a post hoc manifestation of the constituent power, which is the inherent power of the people to bypass an existing constitution to adopt a new constitution.

Article 11 was used for constitutional changes for the second and final time in 1969, but the "No" prevailed, causing Charles de Gaulle to resign from the presidency.

On 21 July 2008, Parliament passed constitutional reforms championed by President Nicolas Sarkozy by a margin of two votes. The changes, when finalized, introduced a consecutive two-term limit for the presidency, gave Parliament a veto over some presidential appointments, ended government control over Parliament's committee system, allowed Parliament to set its own agenda, allowed the president to address Parliament in-session and ended the president's right of collective pardon. (See French constitutional law of 23 July 2008).

Timeline of French constitutions

See also
 Article 49 of the French Constitution
 Constitutionalism
 French Constitutional Council
 Constitutional economics
 Fifth Republic (France)
 French Community, which succeeded the French Union
 Government of France
 Politics of France
 Parliamentary immunity in France
 De Gaulle's 1946 Bayeux speech, in which he outlined his vision of the constitution

Notes and references

Further reading
 
 
 Hoffmann, Stanley H. (1959). "The French Constitution of 1958 – I. The Final Text and its Prospects". American Political Science Review 53 (2): 332–357.
 
 
 Frédéric Monera, L'idée de République et la jurisprudence du Conseil constitutionnel – Paris : L.G.D.J., 2004 -.
 Martin A. Rogoff, "French Constitutional Law: Cases and Materials" – Durham, North Carolina: Carolina Academic Press, 2010.
 
 Wahl, Nicholas (1959). "The French Constitution of 1958 – II. The Initial Draft and its Origins". American Political Science Review 53 (2): 358–382.

External links

 
 
 

Constitutions of France
1958 in law
Legal history of France
1958 documents